Lost and Won is a 1917 American silent drama film directed by James Young. It is preserved at the Library of Congress.

Cast
 Marie Doro as Cinders
 Elliott Dexter as Walter Crane
 Carl Stockdale as Kirkland Gaige
 Mayme Kelso as Cleo Duvene
 Robert Gray as Bill Holt
 Clarence Geldart (as C. H. Geldart)
 Mabel Van Buren

References

External links

allmovie/synopsis

1917 films
Films directed by James Young
Silent American drama films
1917 drama films
American silent feature films
American black-and-white films
1910s American films